Orm is a given name usually of Scandinavian origin.

People with the given name include:

 Orm or Ormin (12th century), the author of the Ormulum
 Orm Eriksson (c.1476–1521), Norwegian nobleman, executed for involvement in a tax revolt
 Orm Finnendahl (born 1963), German composer
 Orm Fowler (1891–1963), Australian rules footballer, played for Fitzroy and St Kilda
 Orm Øverland (born 1965), Norwegian literary historian and Slavist
 Orm Pleasents (1882–1946), Australian rules footballer, played for Collingwood
 Orm Saunders (1907–1978), Australian rules footballer, played for North Melbourne
 Orm Storolfsson (fl. AD 1000), Icelandic strongman

Fictional
 Orm Embar, a dragon in Ursula K. Le Guin's Earthsea.
 Orm Tostesson, lead character in Frans Bengtsson's The Long Ships

See also
 Orm, author of the Ormulum, a 12th-century Christian text
 Orm, who commissioned the Kirkdale sundial in 11th century England
 Orme (name)